Mohammad Iqbal Memon (25 April 1950 – 14 August 2013), known as Iqbal Mirchi, was an Indian underworld figure, known as the right-hand man of India's most wanted criminal, Dawood Ibrahim. Mirchi was often called a drug baron for his thriving narcotics business across Asia, Africa and Europe. On 1 June 2004, he was sanctioned under the Foreign Narcotics Kingpin Designation Act. Mirchi first gained notoriety in the early 1990s as one of the world's top drug lords, and a major figurehead in the 1993 Bombay bombings.

Memon's family originally owned shops selling chillies and spices and thus he got the nickname 'Mirchi'. Mirchi's fortunes soared after he began smuggling in banned meth tablets, heroin and Mandrax. He also owned a disco called The Fisherman's Wharf at Worli seafront in Mumbai which was a hotbed for narcotics.

In May 1986, Mirchi was first nabbed by the Directorate of Revenue Intelligence in connection with the seizing of 600 kg of heroin — valued at around Rs 9 crore — from a farmhouse in Thane. However, prosecutors could not link Mirchi with the farmhouse and he was let off. When the heat became too much, Mirchi left India in late 1980s first to Dubai and later to London. The front for all his businesses in the UK was a rice mill called Eden Fine Rice.

He was first arrested by Interpol in London in April 1995, following a red corner notice for his arrest issued by the CBI. An extradition request was made on the basis that Mirchi was wanted for ordering a murder, and was the prime suspect in two drug seizure cases.

However, in 1999, all investigations of Iqbal Mirchi were called off for lack of evidence. The Indian government also lost its extradition proceedings against Mirchi. Mirchi died of a heart attack in London, at the age of 63 in 2013. At the time of his death, a new investigation went underway, linking him to Indian Premier League match-fixing and several drug offenses.

Mirchi always claimed that he was a victim of persecution, and that all the allegations against him were unfounded and biased. In an interview with The Guardian in London, Mirchi maintained his stance, explaining that was how he won his extradition proceedings. Mirchi also denied being associated with Dawood Ibrahim in any way. In addition, Mirchi claimed he was a "law-abiding person with no convictions," and that he was "being victimised for being a successful businessman".

Though many allegations were produced in the media against Mirchi, he was never formally charged or convicted of any crime. In April 2016, Mirchi was named in the Panama papers for stashing black money in foreign bank accounts.

Personal life
Iqbal Mirchi married twice. His first wife is Hajira Memon, by whom he has two sons, Asif and Junaid. All of them live in the United Kingdom. Mirchi's second wife is the former actress Heena Kausar, daughter of the famous film-maker K. Asif (producer-director of the epic Mughal-e-Azam) by his third wife, the actress Nigar Sultana. Mirchi and Heena got married in 1991 and they had no children together. Heena also continues to reside in the United Kingdom after Mirchi's death.

References

1950 births
2013 deaths
20th-century Indian Muslims
Indian drug traffickers
Criminals from Mumbai
D-Company
People named in the Panama Papers
People sanctioned under the Foreign Narcotics Kingpin Designation Act
1993 Bombay bombings
Memon people